Spilasma is a genus of orb-weaver spiders first described by Eugène Simon in 1897.  it contains only three species.

References

Araneidae
Araneomorphae genera
Spiders of Central America
Spiders of South America
Taxa named by Eugène Simon